Fenobucarb is a carbamate insecticide, also widely known as BPMC. A pale yellow or pale red liquid, insoluble in water; used as an agricultural insecticide, especially for control of Hemipteran pests, on rice and cotton and moderately toxic for humans.

Synonyms
2-(1-methylpropyl)phenol methylcarbamate; 2-(1-methylpropyl)phenyl methylcarbamate; 2-sec-Butylphenyl N-methylcarbamate; BPMC; fenocarb; N-methyl o-sec-butylphenyl carbamate

Tradenames
Fenobucarb, Osbac, Bassa, Bipvin, Baycarb, etc

LD50 
Male Mouse 340 mg/kg
Male Rat 410 mg/kg

References

Acetylcholinesterase inhibitors
Carbamate insecticides
Phenol esters
Aromatic carbamates